The 1981 RAC Tricentrol British Saloon Car Championship was the 24th season of the championship. Win Percy won his second consecutive drivers title in his Mazda RX-7.

Teams and drivers

Calendar and winners
All races were held in the United Kingdom. Overall winners in bold.

Championship standings

Drivers' Championship
Points were awarded on a 9, 6, 4, 3, 2, 1 basis to the top six finishers in each class, with one bonus point for the fastest lap in each class. In races where a class had less than four starters, points would be awarded to the top two finishers (6 & 4 respectively) with one point for the fastest lap. A driver's best nine scores counted towards the championship, dropped scores are shown in brackets. Positions are shown as overall/class.

Notes:
1. – Class A pole position for round 2 is unknown.
2. – Class A & B pole positions for round 3 are unknown.

External links
Touring Car Racing History – 1981 BSCC

British Touring Car Championship seasons
Saloon Car